"Shady Grove" is a traditional Appalachian folk song (Roud 4456), believed to have originated in eastern Kentucky around the beginning the 20th century. The song was popular among old-time musicians of the Cumberlands before being widely adopted in the bluegrass repertoire. Many variants of "Shady Grove" exist (up to 300 stanzas by the early 21st century). 

The lyrics describes "the true love of a young man's life and his hope they will wed," and it is sometimes identified as a courting song.

Link to "Matty Groves" 
The Dorian mode melody was first published as "Shady Grove" in the Journal of American Folklore in 1915, but it was traditionally used in Appalachia for the ballad Matty Groves, as sung by traditional singers including Sheila Kay Adams ("Lady Margaret") and Dillard Chandler ("Mathie Groves"). This suggests that the melody may originate in England or Scotland. The fact that "Shady Grove" and "Matty Groves" share a tune suggests that "Shady Grove" is a variant of "Matty Groves". There is also speculation that the name Shady Grove may be a place-name, a woman's name or nickname, or possibly a mondegreen.

Popular versions 
Doc Watson helped popularize "Shady Grove", after presumably learning it from Jean Ritchie, who in turn learned the song from her father.

Fairport Convention released a popular version of Matty Groves in 1969 using the traditional "Shady Grove" tune on their album Liege and Lief. The tune was also used by folk duo John Roberts and Tony Barrand for "The False Lady", a variant of "Young Hunting".

"Shady Grove" has been recorded by numerous artists, including Jean Ritchie, the Kingston Trio, Jerry Garcia and David Grisman, Mudcrutch, Bill Monroe, Billy Strings, Suzy Bogguss, Crooked Still, Taj Mahal, Doc Watson and Clarence Ashley, Blood Oranges, Quicksilver Messenger Service, The Chieftains, Uncle Sinner, Jayke Orvis, and Camper Van Beethoven.

Score
One score is as follows:

References

External links
Live version of "Shady Grove" by Doc Watson recorded at the 1996 Florida Folk Festival and reproduced by the State Archives of Florida (source page)

Doc Watson songs
The Kingston Trio songs
Taj Mahal (musician) songs
Jean Ritchie songs
Year of song unknown
Songwriter unknown
Appalachian folk songs